Sinclair Township may refer to one of the following places:

In Canada

Sinclair Township, Muskoka District Municipality, Ontario (historical)

In the United States

Sinclair Township, Jewell County, Kansas
Sinclair Township, Clearwater County, Minnesota
Sinclair Township, Stutsman County, North Dakota

See also

St. Clair Township (disambiguation)
Sinclair (disambiguation)

Township name disambiguation pages